The 1957–58 international cricket season was from September 1957 to April 1958.

Season overview

December

Australia in South Africa

January

Pakistan in the West Indies

March

Ceylon in India

References

International cricket competitions by season
1957 in cricket
1958 in cricket